is a railway station on the Sasshō Line in Kita-ku, Sapporo, Hokkaido, Japan, operated by the Hokkaido Railway Company (JR Hokkaido). The station is numbered G05.

While situated relatively close to Asabu Station on the Namboku Line of the Sapporo Municipal Subway, there are no transfer passageways between these two stations.

Lines

Station layout
The elevated station has two side platforms serving two tracks. The station has automated ticket machines, automated turnstiles which accept Kitaca, and a "Midori no Madoguchi" staffed ticket office.

Platforms

History
The station opened on 20 November 1934.

References

External links

 Station information and map 

Railway stations in Sapporo
Railway stations in Japan opened in 1934
Stations of Hokkaido Railway Company
Kita-ku, Sapporo